Yasir Ali Chowdhury (born 6 March 1996), also known as  Yasir Ali Rabbi, is a Bangladeshi cricketer.
Yasir Ali Chowdhury is a young Bangladeshi middle-order batter who played the 2014 Under-19 World Cup. He also plays for Abahani Limited in List A cricket. He made his first-class debut for Chittagong Division in December 2012 against Barisal Division. 
He made his international debut for the Bangladesh cricket team.

Career
In October 2018, he was named in the squad for the Chittagong Vikings team, following the draft for the 2018–19 Bangladesh Premier League. In December 2018, he was named in Bangladesh's team for the 2018 ACC Emerging Teams Asia Cup. In April 2019, he was named in Bangladesh's One Day International (ODI) squad for the 2019 Ireland Tri-Nation Series, but he did not play.

In August 2019, he was one of 35 cricketers named in a training camp ahead of Bangladesh's 2019–20 season. In November 2019, he was named in Bangladesh's squad for the 2019 ACC Emerging Teams Asia Cup in Bangladesh. Later the same month, he was selected to play for the Cumilla Warriors in the 2019–20 Bangladesh Premier League, and he was named in Bangladesh's under-23's squad for the men's cricket tournament at the 2019 South Asian Games. The Bangladesh team won the gold medal, after they beat Sri Lanka by seven wickets in the final.

In February 2020, he was named in Bangladesh's Test squad for their one-off match against Zimbabwe. In January 2021, he was one of four uncapped players to be named in a preliminary squad for the One Day International (ODI) series against the West Indies. In January 2021, he was named in Bangladesh's Test squad for their series against the West Indies. In April 2021, he was named in Bangladesh's preliminary Test squad for their series against Sri Lanka. In June 2021, he was again named in Bangladesh's Test squad, this time for the one-off Test against Zimbabwe.

In November 2021, he was named in Bangladesh's Twenty20 International (T20I) squad for their series against Pakistan. Later the same month, he was again named in Bangladesh's Test squad, also for the series against Pakistan. He made his Test debut on 26 November 2021, for Bangladesh against Pakistan.

In February 2022, he was named in Bangladesh's One Day International (ODI) squad for their series against Afghanistan. Later the same month, he was named in Bangladesh's T20I squad, also for the series against Afghanistan. He made his ODI debut on 23 February 2022, for Bangladesh against Afghanistan. He made his T20I debut on 3 March 2022, also for Bangladesh against Afghanistan.

References

External links
 

1996 births
Living people
Bangladeshi cricketers
Bangladesh Test cricketers
Bangladesh One Day International cricketers
Bangladesh Twenty20 International cricketers
People from Chittagong District
Abahani Limited cricketers
Prime Bank Cricket Club cricketers
Brothers Union cricketers
Khulna Tigers cricketers
Chattogram Challengers cricketers
South Asian Games gold medalists for Bangladesh
South Asian Games medalists in cricket